Cannola may refer to:

A brand of marijuana-infused cooking oil, one of a number of cannabis foods

See also
 Cannoli, Sicilian pastry desserts
 Canola, the edible cooking oil from rapeseed (Brassica campestris)
 Canola (mythology), the inventor of the harp in Irish myth